Alan Rural District is in the Central District of Sardasht County, West Azerbaijan province, Iran. At the National Census of 2006, its population was 4,489 in 939 households. There were 4,756 inhabitants in 1,236 households at the following census of 2011. At the most recent census of 2016, the population of the rural district was 4,907 in 1,431 households. The largest of its 51 villages was Eslamabad, with 1,056 people.

References 

Sardasht County

Rural Districts of West Azerbaijan Province

Populated places in West Azerbaijan Province

Populated places in Sardasht County